Coritiba Foot Ball Club Junior Team is the youth team of Brazilian football club Coritiba Foot Ball Club.

Achievements 
 Copa do Brasil Under-20 (1): 2021 
 Dallas Cup (2): 2012, 2015 (USA)
 Torneio Gradisca (2): 2013, 2014 (Italy)
 IberCup U-17 (1): 2020 (Brazil)
 Taça Belo Horizonte de Juniores (1): 2010 (Brazil)
 Campeonato Paranaense (Parana Youth Cup) (33): 1931, 1932, 1933, 1934, 1935, 1936, 1937, 1938, 1939, 1946, 1947, 1949, 1950, 1952, 1953, 1954, 1955, 1957, 1959, 1960, 1971, 1972, 1973, 1980, 1982, 1984, 1989, 1992, 1995, 1999, 2009, 2012, 2013
In all categories

Coritiba Foot Ball Club